Alfred Mayo Wilson (December 31, 1903 – October 27, 1989) was an American rower who competed in the 1924 Summer Olympics. In 1924, he was part of the American boat, which won the gold medal in the eights.

References

External links
 
 
 

1903 births
1989 deaths
American male rowers
Olympic gold medalists for the United States in rowing
Rowers at the 1924 Summer Olympics
Medalists at the 1924 Summer Olympics